Central Power Purchasing Agency-Guarantee (CPPA-G)  is the market operator in Pakistan and is facilitating the power market transition from the current single buyer to a competitive market. 

It was established in 2015 and was separated from the National Transmission & Despatch Company.

References

Pakistani companies established in 2015
Government-owned companies of Pakistan
Companies based in Islamabad
Electric power in Pakistan